Eugene Crum Foshee, Sr. (December 13, 1937 – March 18, 2017) was an American politician.

Born in Red Level, Covington County, Alabama, Foshee owned a cotton and peanut farm in Red Level. He served in the Alabama House of Representatives from 1966 to 1970 and was a Democrat. Foshee then served in the Alabama Senate and retired in 1994. After he retired, Foshee was a consultant in government relations.

Notes

External links

1937 births
2017 deaths
People from Covington County, Alabama
Farmers from Alabama
Democratic Party Alabama state senators
Democratic Party members of the Alabama House of Representatives